The 7th Screen Awards also The Seventh Annual Screen–Videocon Awards ceremony, presented by Indian Express Group, honored the best Indian Hindi-language films of 2000. The ceremony was held on 20 January 2001 at Andheri Sports Complex, Mumbai, and hosted by Rahul Khanna and co-hosted by Sonali Bendre, Aditi Govitrikar and Nafisa Joseph. The event was telecasted on DD National 9:00 PM and Sahara TV 09:30 PM on 21 January 2001.

Kaho Naa... Pyaar Hai led the ceremony with 17 nominations, followed by Mission Kashmir with 14 nominations and Mohabbatein with 11 nominations.

Kaho Naa... Pyaar Hai won 9 awards, including Best Film, Best Director (for Rakesh Roshan) and Best Actor (for Hrithik Roshan), thus becoming the most-awarded film at the ceremony.

Awards 

The winners and nominees have been listed below. Winners are listed first, highlighted in boldface, and indicated with a double dagger.

Jury Awards

Technical Awards

Special awards

Superlatives

References

External links 
 The Screen Awards (2001) at the Internet Movie Database

Screen Awards